The WCCW Parade of Champions was a series of professional wrestling supercards promoted by Fritz Von Erich's World Class Championship Wrestling first in 1961, in 1972 and then annually from 1984 through 1988. Von Erich used the "Parade of Champions" name in 1984 as a way to honor his recently deceased son, David and the subsequent Parade of Champions were all "Von Erich Memorial" Parades of Champions. At the inaugural Von Erich Memorial event, in front of the largest crowd ever to watch a pro wrestling event in the United States up to that point, Kerry Von Erich defeated Ric Flair for the NWA World Heavyweight Championship, only to lose it back to Flair 18 days later in Yokohama, Japan. Over the next few years, Von Erich altered the names as tragedy repeatedly struck his family. The Parade of Champions was the most recognized event that World Class Championship Wrestling, later known as World Class Wrestling Association, promoted. There was a Parade of Champions super card held by Southern Sports (precursor to WCCW) in 1961 and another held by Big Time Wrestling (the previous name of WCCW) in 1972. All Parade of Champions supercards were held at Texas Stadium in Irving, Texas. A wrestling organization out of Texas called NWA Southwest ran an event in late August, 2010, called Parade of Champions, which it claimed was the "Longest Running Wrestling Event In Texas History Dating Back To 1972," but there was no actual connection between the WCCW show event other than the name.

Southwest Sports Parade of Champions

The Southwest Sports Parade of Champions was a major professional wrestling event held by Dallas, Texas based Southwest Sports on January 31, 1961 at the Texas Stadium  in Irving, Texas. Southwest Sports would later be named Big Time Wrestling, then World Class Championship Wrestling and finally World Class Wrestling Association.

Southwest Sports Parade of Champions

The Southwest Sports Parade of Champions was a major professional wrestling event held by Dallas, Texas based Southwest Sports on January 29, 1963 at the Dallas Sportatorium in Dallas, Texas. Southwest Sports would later be named Big Time Wrestling, then World Class Championship Wrestling and finally World Class Wrestling Association.

Southwest Sports Parade of Champions

The Southwest Sports Parade of Champions was a major professional wrestling event held by Dallas, Texas based Southwest Sports on June 4, 1963 at the Dallas Sportatorium in Dallas, Texas. Southwest Sports would later be named Big Time Wrestling, then World Class Championship Wrestling and finally World Class Wrestling Association.

Big Time Wrestling Parade of Champions

The Big Time Wrestling Parade of Champions was a major professional wrestling event held by Dallas, Texas based Big Time Wrestling on June 24, 1972 at the Texas Stadium in Irving, Texas. Southwest Sports would later be named World Class Championship Wrestling and later on World Class Wrestling Association.

Big Time Wrestling Parade of Champions

The Big Time Wrestling Parade of Champions was a major professional wrestling event held by Dallas, Texas based Big Time Wrestling on March 26, 1974 at the Memorial Auditorium in Dallas, Texas. Big Time Wrestling would later be named World Class Championship Wrestling and later on World Class Wrestling Association.

Big Time Wrestling Parade of Champions

The Big Time Wrestling Parade of Champions was a major professional wrestling event held by Dallas, Texas based Big Time Wrestling on March 27, 1974 at the Municipal Auditorium in San Antonio, Texas. Big Time Wrestling would later be named World Class Championship Wrestling and later on World Class Wrestling Association.

Superbowl of Wrestling

The Superbowl of Wrestling was a major professional wrestling event held by Dallas, Texas based Big Time Wrestling on June 5, 1976 at the Texas Stadium in Irving, Texas. Big Time Wrestling would later be named World Class Championship Wrestling and later on World Class Wrestling Association.

1st Von Erich Memorial Parade of Champions

The 1st Von Erich Memorial Parade of Champions was a major professional wrestling event held by Dallas, Texas based World Class Championship Wrestling (WCCW) on May 6, 1984 at the Texas Stadium in Irving, Texas. The event was held by WCCW promoter Fritz Von Erich in memory of his son David Von Erich, who had died in February, 1984. In the main event David's brother Kerry Von Erich faced the NWA World Heavyweight Champion Ric Flair, taking the title match that was originally planned for David Von Erich that same year. In a very emotional match Von Erich defeated Flair to win the championship in honor of his brother.

2nd Von Erich Memorial Parade of Champions

The 2nd Von Erich Memorial Parade of Champions was a major professional wrestling event held by Dallas, Texas based World Class Championship Wrestling (WCCW) on May 5, 1985 at the Texas Stadium in Irving, Texas. The event was held by WCCW promoter Fritz Von Erich in memory of his son David Von Erich that had died in February, 1984. As a result of Kerry Von Erich's victory over the One Man Gang, manager Gary Hart had his head shaved bald. If Kerry lost, Fritz would have to come out of retirement and face One Man Gang one-on-one. The match between The Fantastics and The Midnight Express for the vacant NWA American Tag Team Championship was held in two rings side-by-side. The Midnight Express' manager Jim Cornette was handcuffed to the Fantastics cornerman, "Little John", who stood over 7 feet tall.  Referee David Manning awarded the match and the title to the Fantastics, although Manning's pin count of a Fantastics member pinning a Midnight Express member started after referee Rick Hazzard's pin count of a Midnight Express member pinning a Fantastics member ended at 3.  This match appears on the WWE Home Video "The Triumphs and Tragedies of World Class Championship Wrestling" DVD. Per stipulations, the winning team of the main event split $100,000 and the wrestler who eliminated the last wrestler won a brand new Lincoln Continental.  Kevin Von Erich won the event with a spectacular dive from one ring over the ropes to another to pin Steve Williams.  After the match, Gino Hernandez destroyed the windshield of the Lincoln Continental with a chain, with Chris Adams placing a boot on the destroyed windshield for good measure causing it to cave in.

3rd Von Erich Memorial Parade of Champions

The 3rd Von Erich Memorial Parade of Champions was a major professional wrestling event held by Dallas, Texas based World Championship Wrestling Association (WCWA) on May 4, 1986 at the Texas Stadium in Irving, Texas. The event was held by WCCW promoter Fritz Von Erich in memory of his son David Von Erich who died in 1984. On the show the Great Kabuki was to have faced four wrestlers in this handicap match, one at a time.  The fourth wrestler he was to have faced was Chris Adams. Michael Hayes began berating Adams after Steve Simpson defeated Kabuki, prompting Adams to superkick both Hayes and Kabuki out of the ring.

4th Von Erich Memorial Parade of Champions

The 4th Von Erich Memorial Parade of Champions was a major professional wrestling event held by Dallas, Texas based World Championship Wrestling Association (WCWA) on May 3, 1987 at the Texas Stadium in Irving, Texas. The event was held by WCCW promoter Fritz Von Erich in memory of his sons David Von Erich and Mike Von Erich.

This event won the 1987 award for Most Disgusting Promotional Tactic from the Wrestling Observer Newsletter; the combination of Mike Von Erich's name attached to the event (his suicide had been less than a month ago) and use of stipulations such as a scaffold match and women's mud wrestling was seen as exploitative.

5th Von Erich Memorial Parade of Champions

The 5th Von Erich Memorial Parade of Champions was a major professional wrestling event held by Dallas, Texas based World Championship Wrestling Association (WCWA) on May 7, 1988 at the Texas Stadium in Irving, Texas. The event was held by WCCW promoter Fritz Von Erich in memory of his sons David Von Erich and Mike Von Erich. The fifth version of the Parade of Champions would be the last show promoted under that name by the Von Erich family.

References

External sources
 Parade of Champions Results at World Class Tribute
 WCCW Wrestling Cards at the Wrestling Information Archive

1961 in professional wrestling
1972 in professional wrestling
1984 in professional wrestling
1985 in professional wrestling
1986 in professional wrestling
1987 in professional wrestling
1988 in professional wrestling
World Class Championship Wrestling shows
Events in Texas
Professional wrestling in the Dallas–Fort Worth metroplex